The Messenger, released in the United States as I Am the Messenger, is a 2002 novel by Markus Zusak, and winner of the 2003 Children's Book Council of Australia Book of the Year Award. The story is written from the perspective of the protagonist, taxi driver Ed Kennedy, whose journey begins after he stops a robbery and receives a playing card in the mail.

Plot
The protagonist is Ed Kennedy, an uninspired nineteen-year-old Australian taxi driver. Ed laments his mediocre life and strained relationship with his mother, as his father died recently and left Ed with only his dog, the Doorman, but does nothing to improve his situation, instead preferring to continue living alone and playing cards every week with his friends: Ritchie, who is unemployed and generally apathetic about life; Marv, a stingy carpenter; and Audrey, a fellow taxi driver whom Ed is in love with, although she does not reciprocate. After accidentally foiling a robbery he is proclaimed a hero by the public, though the robber leaves him a warning that he sees "a dead man" when he looks at Ed before being taken away by police.

One night, he receives a small unmarked envelope, inside of which is an Ace of Diamonds with three addresses and times of day written on them. His friends deny involvement, so Ed investigates the three addresses. Ed arrives at the first address at midnight, and witnesses a man raping his wife while their daughter cries on the porch. The second corresponds to a senile widow named Milla who lives alone, and the third is the address of a young girl named Sophie who runs barefoot every morning but still cannot win at her track meets. Realizing that the sender of the cards intends for Ed to involve himself with the three people, Ed researches Milla's history and discovers that she is waiting for her husband Jimmy, who died sixty years ago during World War II, so he pretends to be Jimmy and comes to read to her weekly. For Sophie, he raises her spirits by giving her an empty shoe box to encourage her to try running barefoot at her next competition; although she loses again, she still finds pride in her achievement. Ed is initially unsure how to approach the rapist, until he receives a gun in the mail with one bullet, indicating he is to shoot the man.Ed uses the gun to kidnap the man and threaten him to stop raping his wife. Ed, instead of killing the man,shoots the gun at the sky, and leaves the man, drugged to sleep with sleeping pill laced vodka, lying on the ground.

After finishing the Ace of Diamonds, two masked men break into his house, assault him, and leave him a congratulatory letter as well as an Ace of Clubs with a vague clue. Before going, the men inform Ed that the man who he threatened has left town. The next day, Ed reveals to Audrey his involvement in the cards, before telling her that he wishes the two of them could be together, but Audrey declines him. Eventually, Ed picks up a man in his cab who tells him to drive to the river before leading Ed on a chase to a rock formation on which the three names are written for Ed to "solve." The first is Thomas O'Reilly, a pastor in a run-down area of the city with a dwindling congregation; Ed helps him by organizing and advertising for a party with free beer in order to encourage everyone to come on Sunday. The next, Angie Carusso, is a single mother who Ed witnesses buying ice cream for her children, and he buys her one as well to show that she is appreciated. Finally, Gavin Rose is a young boy who constantly fights his brother, so Ed beats up Gavin in order to encourage the brother to take revenge, which they do one night by assaulting Ed and cementing their brotherhood.

After participating in a yearly football game, Ed's dog is stolen and he has to buy it back from a boy, who also gives him the Ace of Spades, on which are three names of famous authors. After trying to kiss Audrey one day and being gently rejected again, he goes to the library and eventually realizes that the street names come from parts of the title, with notes written on certain page numbers for specific addresses. The first, Glory Road, has Lua Tatupu, whose family has decorated their home for Christmas with strings of broken lights, so Ed buys new ones for them and sets them up himself. On Clown Street, Ed runs into his mother on a date, and he eventually drives to her house and confronts her about her disdain for him before reconciling. Finally, on Bell Street he meets an old man named Bernie Price who runs an antiquated theater. Ed brings Audrey there to watch Cool Hand Luke and invites Bernie to watch it with them, but eventually the screen cuts to videos of Ed performing his tasks so far.

Ed finds the Ace of Hearts on his seat in the theatre, on which is written three movie titles. After consulting with Bernie, he realizes that they are references to his three friends Ritchie, Marv, and Audrey. He talks to Ritchie late one night and the two stand in a river for an hour, as Ed encourages him to search for something he cares about. Afterwards, Ed, confused by Marv's stinginess, asks him for a loan as a ploy, causing Marv to reveal that he has been saving money to care for a child he had with a girl named Suzanne Boyd who moved away after she became pregnant years ago. After discussing it, Ed convinces him to travel to her house, and although Suzanne's father angrily claims that he brought shame upon the family, the two eventually reconcile and Marv is reconnected with Suzanne and their daughter. Finally, Ed comes to Audrey early one morning and dances with her for three minutes to show his love for her, hoping that she can love him back.

Upon returning elatedly to his place, he finds a Joker with his own address written on it, which bothers him greatly because he assumed he had finished. One day a man enters his cab and asks him to drive to every address he has been to so far, taking him on a tour of his accomplishments, before revealing that he was the robber, who asks Ed if he still sees "a dead man" when he looks in the mirror, before telling him to go back home. Inside is a man who claims responsibility for the entire series of events, before handing him a folder that details all of Ed's adventures. In a postmodern twist, the man is strongly implied to be Markus Zusak himself, who has written Ed's story right down to the current discussion they are having. He leaves Ed to consider the philosophical implications, and Ed stays inside for days before Audrey comes one afternoon and asks to stay with him for good. They kiss and Ed explains everything to her, before realizing that the story he resides in is actually a reminder to others of their true potential, ending with "'I'm not the messenger at all. I'm the message.'"

Adaptations

Stage 

In 2008 the novel was adapted for the stage by Ross Mueller. It was first performed by the "Canberra Youth Theatre" on 24 November 2008.

In 2011 the novel was adapted again for the stage by Curtin's Hayman Theatre Company and performed at the "Subiaco Arts Centre" in Perth, Western Australia.

In 2015 the novel was adapted for stage by Xavier Hazard and Archie Stapleton and performed by the Redfoot Youth Theatre Company in Perth, Western Australia.

Television

A series based on the novel was greenlight by Australian network, ABC, in May 2022 which is set to premiere in 2023, William McKenna will play Ed Kennedy and will be produced by Lingo Pictures productions. Major production investment from Screen Australia in association with the ABC. Financed with support from Screen NSW and All3Media International. Producers Jason Stephens and Elisa Argenzio. Executive Producers Helen Bowden, Markus Zusak, Mika Zusak, Sarah Lambert and Daniel Nettheim. ABC Executive Producers Rebecca Anderson and Sally Riley.

Awards 

 Won – New South Wales Premier's Literary Awards: Ethel Turner Prize for Young People's Literature (2003)
 Won – CBCA Children's Book of the Year Award: Older Readers (2003)
 Won – Publishers Weekly Best Books of the Year for Children (2005)
 Bulletin Blue Ribbon Book (2006)
 Won – Honour Book, Michael L. Printz Award (2006)
 Won – Deutscher Jugendliteraturpreis (2007)

References 

2002 Australian novels
Australian young adult novels
Pan Books books
CBCA Children's Book of the Year Award-winning works
Novels by Markus Zusak
Novels set in Australia
Australian novels adapted into plays